William Mansel may refer to:

William Lort Mansel, an English churchman and academic, Master of Trinity College, Cambridge and Bishop of Bristol.
William Mansel (MP for Gloucestershire), see Gloucestershire (UK Parliament constituency)
Sir William Mansel, 7th Baronet (1670-c. 1732) of the Mansel Baronets
Sir William Mansel, 9th Baronet (1739-1804) of the Mansel Baronets, MP for Carmarthenshire (UK Parliament constituency)
Sir William Mansel, 10th Baronet (1766-1829) of the Mansel Baronets

See also
William Mansell (disambiguation)